Peripatopsis mira is a species of velvet worm in the family Peripatopsidae. This species is a clade in the P. clavigera species complex. This species has 17 pairs of legs, varies from slate black to charcoal, and is found on the south-facing slope of the Outeniqua mountain range in Western Cape province in South Africa.

References 

Animals described in 2020
Endemic fauna of South Africa
Onychophorans of temperate Africa
Onychophoran species